Corey Crawford (born December 1, 1991) is a former American football defensive end and current coach. He attended Clemson University, G.W. Carver HS Columbus, Georgia, and Hargrave Military Academy in Virginia.

College career
Crawford committed to Clemson in 2011 as a four-star recruit and spent his entire collegiate career with the Tigers.

Professional career
Crawford was signed by the Redskins as an undrafted free agent on May 7, 2015. He was released on September 5, 2015 and signed to the practice squad the following day. He signed a futures contract with the Redskins on January 12, 2016, but was released on September 3, 2016. On June 8, 2017, Crawford signed with the Columbus Lions.  In September 2017, Crawford re-signed with the Lions for 2018. He signed with the Carolina Cobras in 2019, but was placed on the team suspension list after signing with the Memphis Express of the Alliance of American Football on March 13, 2019. After the AAF suspended football operations, he was activated by the Cobras on April 3. He was placed on the refused to report list on April 6.

In October 2019, he was drafted by the Houston Roughnecks in the 2020 XFL Draft. He had his contract terminated when the league suspended operations on April 10, 2020.

Coaching career
Crawford began his coaching career in 2022, joining the staff at his alma mater, Clemson, as a defensive graduate assistant.

References

1991 births
Living people
Washington Redskins players
Clemson Tigers football players
Columbus Lions players
Memphis Express (American football) players
Players of American football from Columbus, Georgia
Carolina Cobras (NAL) players
Houston Roughnecks players